William Bradley Coley (January 12, 1862 – April 16, 1936) was an American bone surgeon and cancer researcher best known for his early contributions to the study of cancer immunotherapy. Although his work was not proven effective in his lifetime, modern discoveries and research in immunology have led to a greater appreciation for his work in cancer immunotherapy and his targeted therapy, Coley's toxins. Today, Coley is recognized as the Father of Cancer Immunotherapy for his contributions to the science.

Early life and career

Education
William Coley was born on January 12, 1862, in Saugatuck, a neighborhood of Westport, Connecticut. His parents were Horace Bradley Coley and Clarina B. Wakeman. He received his bachelor's degree in Classics from Yale University and his medical degree from Harvard Medical School in 1888. After his schooling, Coley began working at New York Hospital, now Weill Cornell Medical Center, as a surgical intern.

Early sarcoma patients
In 1890, Coley began his first year of private practice at New York Hospital and met Elizabeth (Bessie) Dashiell, a 17-year-old patient who would later go on to inspire Coley to search for better methods of treating sarcoma. Dashiell visited Coley after suffering from a hand injury which he soon discovered to be an aggressive bone tumor. Treatment for sarcoma at the time was scarce; the most widely accepted form of treatment was a complete amputation of the affected limb. Despite receiving such a critical surgery as forearm amputation, Bessie died just ten weeks later due to widespread metastasis of the original cancer. Bessie's death had a profound effect on Coley's approach to practicing medicine. Coley was distressed that even modern medicine's customary procedure still could not save the life of one of his first patients. Coley then decided to take the search for new possible treatments into his own hands, soon becoming one of the medical community's model clinician-scientists.

A clinician-scientist at work
After the death of Bessie Dashiell, Dr. Coley decided to review and research similar cases of sarcoma in the medical files at New York Hospital, where he found a case of interest involving a patient, a German immigrant named Fred Stein, with an inoperable tumor in his neck. To the astonishment of the doctors in the hospital at the time, Stein's round cell sarcoma seemingly vanished after being diagnosed with erysipelas, a skin infection now known to be caused by the bacterium Streptococcus pyogenes. Curious to discover the reason for the man's remission, Coley decided to search for the hospital's discharged patient, who he eventually found in Manhattan with no trace of cancer left in his body. Coley, wondering if Stein's case of post-procedural erysipelas may have some correlation to his remission, then began thoroughly reviewing similar cases of bacterial infections having positive effects on malignant tumors. He found that his suspicion was not a new one in oncology. In 1853, Sir James Paget alluded to the fact that he himself had reason to believe that an infection may cause tumor regression. Coley had even found cases that aligned almost exactly with the Fred Stein's malignant tumor. In 1866, German physician Wilhelm Busch found similar evidence that his own patient had experienced a significant regression in his malignant tumor after contracting a post-operative infection, erysipelas. As Coley continued his investigation, he found forty-seven cases that suggested that infections may, in fact, be linked to cancer regression and could become a possible method of cancer treatment in the future.

Developing Coley's toxins

After months of research devoted to finding the connection between cancerous patients developing infections and their own remission, Coley decided to pursue his notion that such recoveries, considered miraculous at the time, were provoked by an immune response in the body's immune system. In 1891, he began his experiments on a patient named Zola, an Italian immigrant and drug-addict with a life-threatening tumor which he described as "the size of a small hen's egg" in Zola's right tonsil. Hoping to spawn a similar case of remission that he had been studying for the past year, Coley attempted to induce a response by Zola's immune system by injecting streptococcus, a bacterium known to induce erysipelas attacks, directly into his tumor. Five months and several trials of injection later, Zola finally developed full-blown erysipelas infection. The tumor once thought to be irreversible then began to dissolve, disappearing within two weeks. Zola recovered and lived another eight years, before eventually succumbing to a recurrence of the tumour

Two years after Zola's initial treatment, Coley treated ten more of his own patients with the same live streptococcus bacteria. Because of the unpredictable nature of infection, which killed patients of his on two separate occasions, Coley changed the bacterial ingredients of what would be coined Coley's toxins from the live streptococcus bacteria, to two dead bacteria,  streptococcus pyogenes and serratia marcescens. The formula change to the use of dead bacteria drastically reduced the risk of death in patients; however, Coley's toxins still remained controversial in the medical community.

Professional reception of Coley's toxins

After studying and publishing the effects of injecting ten of his patients with his own personalized treatment formula, Coley received an abundance of attention and skepticism from doctors and researchers in the field of cancer. Published as an 1893 case series titled "The treatment of malignant tumors by repeated inoculations of Erysipelas, with a report of ten original cases", several medical organizations lacked confidence that his study, labeled as inconsistent and poorly documented, proved real results. The American Cancer Society released a review of the study in which it questions its credibility at such an early stage, stating that "more research would be needed to determine what benefit, if any, this therapy might have for people with cancer." In 1894, the American Medical Association published an editorial with a similar stance, calling question to the "entire failure" of the injections and labeling it as an "alleged remedy." Several physicians at the time had trouble accepting Coley's toxins method when the field itself was struggling to understand what the best plan of action for treating cancer was. James Ewing, a famed cancer pathologist at the time, was one of Coley's biggest critics. A leader in the field of oncology at the time, Ewing was a supporter of the newer method of treatment, radiation therapy, which soon became America's standard method of cancer treatment.

Emergence and popularity of radiation therapy
By 1901, the development of x-rays as a cancer treatment showed great promise. In particular, the therapy resulted in immediate tumor destruction and pain relief. Although Coley claimed successful treatment of hundreds of patients, the absence of proven benefit or reproducibility led to broader emphasis on surgery and on the newly developing field of radiation therapy.  This decision was borne by the eventual successful treatment of millions of people worldwide with radiation therapy.

Coley had arranged for a wealthy friend to provide funds to purchase two x-ray machines for his use. However, after several years of experience, Coley came to the conclusion that the effect of that primitive x-ray therapy in the untrained hands of experimenters was localized, temporary, and not curative. The scientific majority disagreed, most notably his contemporary James Ewing.  His contemporary critics cited the dangerous and unpredictable effects, predominantly the fever caused by the bacteria, that the vaccine had upon individuals weakened by cancer. Furthermore, the  vaccine had to be made to a patient's exact needs, making it more labour-intensive, time-consuming and expensive. Thus, the Coley's vaccine soon became obsolete due to the adoption of radiation technology in cancer treatment.

Commercialization and current use of Coley's Toxins

From its creation in 1893, to 1962 with the introduction of the Kefauver Harris Amendment, Coley's toxins were being used to treat several types of cancers around the world. In the United States, it was exclusively sourced by Parke-Davis, America's oldest and largest drug maker at the time. The passing of the 1962 Kefauver Harris Amendment, however, required Coley's toxins to be labeled as a "new drug" by the Food and Drug Administration. It was this final blow to Coley's life work that drastically reduced the use of the concoction for cancer treatment. Since its changed status under the FDA, it has only been able to be prescribed through experimental clinical trials, which have continuously produced mixed results.

Coley published the results of his work as a case series, making it difficult to interpret them with confidence. According to the American Cancer Society, "More research would be needed to determine what benefit, if any, this therapy might have for people with cancer". Cancer Research UK say that "available scientific evidence does not currently support claims that Coley's toxins can treat or prevent cancer". According to Cancer Research UK's current statement regarding Coley's toxins, people with cancer who participate in the Coley's immunotherapy alongside conventional cancer treatments, or who use it as a substitute for those treatments, risk seriously harming their health.

Legacy

The historical results of Coley's vaccine therapy are difficult to compare with modern results because Coley's studies were not well controlled or adequately documented. Many of his patients had also received other treatments, like radiation or surgery, simultaneously with his vaccine. According to the analyses of Coley Nauts and Starnes, treatment success correlated with length of therapy and the fevers induced by the toxins. However, the very nature of his contributions not only as a physician but as a medical researcher are still being used in the medical community to this day.

Acceptance from the medical community

In 1935, both The Journal of the American Medical Association (JAMA) and renowned cancer surgeon Ernest Amory Codman reversed their positions on the validity of Coley's Toxin in cancer treatment, suggesting that "the combined toxins of erysipelas and prodigiosus "undoubtedly" may sometimes play a significant role in preventing or retarding malignant recurrence or metastases."

Creation of the Cancer Research Institute
Coley's daughter, Helen Coley Nauts (1907–2001), established the nonprofit Cancer Research Institute in 1953 to study her father's work in efforts to "advocate for a cancer research path that investigates harnessing the body’s immune system rather than one that seeks chemicals and radiation to attack the disease." The organization has since become a leader in funding research in immunology and tumor immunology at universities and hospitals worldwide.

Modern Use of Coley's Toxins
In 2005, drug makers including Pfizer and Sanofi-Aventis had a renewed interest in modernizing versions of Coley's toxins; Pfizer has acquired the Coley Pharmaceutical Group, set up in 1997.

Four years later, in 2009, Coley's theory that the immune systems in humans functioned in a cycle was demonstrated by a research team led by Associate Professor Brendon Coventry, which could possibly have significant ramifications for cancer treatment in the future.

Death

William Coley died on April 16, 1936, at the age of 74 in the Hospital for the Ruptured and Crippled (now called the Hospital for Special Surgery) in New York City. He was survived by his wife and two children who continuously worked after his death to preserve Coley's legacy in the field of cancer research.

See also
 William B. Coley Award
 Timeline of immunology

References

Further reading 
 
 Donald HM. (2003) "Coley" Spontaneous Regression: Cancer and the Immune System Philadelphia: Xlibris. 
 Hall, Steven S. (1997) A Commotion in the Blood. New York: Henry Holt and Company. 
 Hess, David J. (1997) Can Bacteria Cause Cancer? Politics and Evaluation of Alternative Medicine. New York: NYU Press.
 
 Hoption Cann SA, van Netten JP, van Netten C. (2003) "Dr William Coley and tumour regression: a place in history or in the future" Postgraduate Medical Journal 79 (938): 672–680   
 Hoption Cann SA, Gunn HD, van Netten JP, van Netten C. (2004) "Spontaneous regression of pancreatic cancer" Case Reports and Clinical Practice Review 293–296

External links
 Cancer Research Institute (CRI) founded by William Coley's daughter Helen Coley Nauts
 "Cancer Miracles" Forbes
 CRI Response to Forbes' "Cancer Miracles" Editorial by Cancer Research Institute executive director Jill O'Donnell-Tormey, Ph.D.
 Coley Pharmaceutical Group
 MBVax Bioscience Inc
 

Cancer researchers
American surgeons
1862 births
1936 deaths
American oncologists
American immunologists
Physicians of Hospital for Special Surgery
Scientists from New York (state)
Yale College alumni
Harvard Medical School alumni